Padma Devi (1917–1983) was a popular Indian Bengali Hindi/Hindustani Film Actress and playback singer of Indian cinema, in the silent era and the early talkies. Starting her career with the main role in Sea Goddess (1931), directed by Dhirubhai Desai and produced by Saroj Film Company, Padma went on to act in over one hundred films in her career.

Early years 

Padma Devi was born on 1917 in Bengal, British India. Her ancestral home was Madaripur. Her real name was Nilima.

Career 

Padma Devi  was one of the earliest action heroines of the Indian Cinema. She started her career with Sea Goddess, filmed in 1931, and was often cast with "dare-devil" Boman Shroff in a stream of successful stunt films such as The Amazon, directed and produced by JBH Wadia, released in 1933.

In his unpublished autobiography, Jamshed Boman Homi Wadia wrote:“I made my last silent thriller 'The Amazon' or 'Dilruba Daku' [w]ith Padma in the stellar role. The [s]tory was the reverse of 'Thunderbolt', with Padma as the masked woman and saviour of the people. Of course, I had to avail of a duplicate in female garb to enact her stunts. Even so, Padma had become an adept in fight sequences and her youth and beauty added glamour to the film. It was the box office success of 'The Amazon' which had induced me to sign Fearless Nadia in my talkies to come, with whom I was to make that super-stunt film 'Hunterwali' and take the Indian film world by storm. (Wadia 1978: ch. 43).”Kisan Kanya starring  Padma Devi is the first indigenously made color movie which was released in 1937. Her work was appreciated in movies like Chalti Duniya, Hindustan Hamara, Jini Ram Tini Krishno Ek-i Dehe Ramkrishna, Sree Sree Ramkrishna Kathamrita, Maa Bhabani Maa Amar and many more.

She has also sung in several films; Sati Mahananda (1933), Maharani (1934), Bahen Ka Prem (1935), Sangdil Samaj (1936), Kisan Kanya (1937) and Zamana (1938) are notable among them. Parallel to her Bollywood career, Padma has also worked in Bengali and Kannada language cinema.

Filmography 

Padma Devi acted in over one hundred films in her career. A partial list:

Last Days 

Padma Devi died on 1 February 1983.

External links

References 

Bengali people
Indian film actresses
Actresses in Hindi cinema
1917 births
1983 deaths